Puntikura/Gongura  is the form of the roselle plant (Hibiscus sabdariffa) grown for its edible leaves in India and in other countries like Fiji. These leaves are used in south-central Indian cuisine to impart a tart flavour. Gongura comes in two varieties, green stemmed leaf and red stemmed. The red stemmed variety is more sour than the green stemmed variety. Gongura is a rich source of iron, vitamins, folic acid and anti-oxidants essential for human nutrition.

Gongura'pacchadi, a form of chutney or relish, is a quintessential part of  Andhra cuisine. Telugu people, mainly from Andhra Pradesh, locally call it  (mother Andhra) in Telugu due to its significance in their daily diet. While it has many culinary uses, the most popular version is the pickled form. Although Gongura is widely consumed in homes all over Andhra Pradesh, Gongura is more popular in hotels, restaurants, eateries and food joints. It is also grown in Karnataka, Odisha,Telangana, Tripura, Arunachal Pradesh (north east region of India) and some parts of Chittagong Hill Tracts region in Bangladesh (which is mainly a tribal people region). It is a popular green vegetable in Chakma community and it is known as "Aamelli". Similarly, Gongura is popular in Tamil Nadu as well, and is called  in Tamil. It is popular in North and Central Karnataka cuisines as "", and is regularly eaten with Jollad (Jowar) rotti. In Marathi, it is called . And is specially prepared to a stew and served to goddess Mahalakshmi/Gauri during the annual festival of Mahalakshmi which falls on three days in between the ten days Ganesha Chaturthi festival in Maharashtra. It is a summer crop, and the hotter the place, the more sour the leaf gets.

Gongura is popular in the state of Andhra Pradesh, Karnataka, Manipur, Tripura and also Mizoram. A baby gongura leaf is a full leaf. As the leaf grows older, the leaf splits into four or more parts.

Other well known recipes made with Gongura as the main ingredient are Gongura pappu (lentils), Gongura mamsam (goat/mutton) and Gongura royyalu (shrimp). In recent times, Gongura Chicken is also being served in restaurants. Gongura and calabash is extremely popular with the Telugu community in South Africa.  It is also eaten by Acholi and Lango people in northern Uganda, where it is known as malakwang.

In the Bodo Community of Assam too, 'Gongura' called as 'Mwitha' is taken very frequently, it is prepared as curry with pork, 'Mwitha-Oma', with pond fish as 'Mwitha-na' with prawns as 'Mwitha-nathur'. The leaves having sour tastes and slippery texture blends easy and makes a wonderful dish with non-veg items. The Bodo community believes that intake of sour helps in fighting the scorching summer heat and prevents illness.

Some more popular curries and pickles made with gongura are as follows:
 Pulla Gongura (Gongura + Red Chillies)
 Pulihara Gongura (Gongura and Tamarind)
 Gongura Pappu (Gongura + Lentils)
 Gongura Pulusu (Gongura stew)
 Gongura Chicken (Gongura + Chicken)

See also 
Roselle (plant), for medicinal uses
Sorrel, sour leaf in European cuisine

References 

 Mahadevan N, Shivali, Pradeed kamboj, Hibiscus sabdariffa linn - An overview, Natural radiance, 2009;8(1):77-83.
 Sekhar, DMR, Sun Roselle, https://www.researchgate.net/publication/253240996_Sun_Roselle?ev=prf_pub
 https://specialtyproduce.com/produce/Gongura_Leaves_11189.php

External links 
 Gongura Pickle Recipe and Video
 Gongura Pappu Recipe

Andhra cuisine
Leaf vegetables
Hibiscus